Common Force was a Chilean centre-left to left-wing political party, founded in 2020 by former members of the Socialist Party of Chile and independent organisations. In August 2020, it became part of the Broad Front, a left-wing political coalition.

On September 24, 2022, through a statement, it was reported that the Common Force political movement became part of the Social Convergence party .

References

External links
 Official site

2020 establishments in Chile
Political parties established in 2020
Political parties in Chile
Left-wing politics in Chile
Socialist parties in Chile

Political parties disestablished in 2022